Martin Chorváth (born 9 October 1980) is a Slovak sprint canoeist who competed in the early to mid-2000s. He won a gold medal in the K-4 200 m event at the 2002 ICF Canoe Sprint World Championships in Seville.

Chorváth also competed in the K-1 500 m event at the 2004 Summer Olympics in Athens, but was eliminated in the semifinals.

References

1980 births
Canoeists at the 2004 Summer Olympics
Living people
Olympic canoeists of Slovakia
Slovak male canoeists
ICF Canoe Sprint World Championships medalists in kayak